Sushil's bushfrog (Raorchestes sushili) is a critically endangered frog found only in the Andiparai Shola in the municipality of Valparai in Coimbatore district, Tamil Nadu, India.

References

External links
 

sushili
Amphibians described in 2009